Jaron D. "J. D." Lawrence (born August 6, 1967) is an American writer, director and producer of films, television and urban stage plays. On April 1, 2018, he released the drama series Your Husband Is Cheating On Us, which was premiered on Bravo TV.

Biography
Lawrence grew up in Amityville, New York. His family business, Who's Laughing Now, has produced "dramedies" (comedy-drama) for the past 25 years. He and his family have launched more than 20 productions, debuting in theaters across the US. He is known for his one-man play, SKITZophrenia, where Lawrence broke a Guinness World Record for "Most Characters Played by One Actor in a Single Theatre". He played 72 different character in the 90-minute production.

Personal life
Lawrence grew up with a speech impediment, for which he was teased. He believed playing different characters is how he overcame the disorder. Lawrence went to Amityville Memorial High School, where he learned to read music and played trombone in the school band. After high school, he moved to Brooklyn, where he began his production and music career. His daughters, Breanna and Taylour, are also involved in his productions.

Productions
The Clean Up Woman (2009)
Community Service (2013)
Fire Fighter Fitness (2015)
Your Husband Is Cheating on Us (2018)

Acting
The Clean Up Woman (2010)
Community Service (2013)
I Really Hate My Ex (2015)
Red Oaks (2015)
Your Husband Is Cheating on Us (2018)
Martin, Malcolm & Me (2019)

Albums
I'm a survivor (2018)
Your Husband Is Cheating on Us (2018)

Awards
Lawrence won a Telly Award for his local cable broadcast The J.D. Lawrence Show.

References

External links
 Interview between Basketball Wives' Shaunie and JD Lawrence
 The Breakfast Club Interview
 J. D. Lawrence profile at IMDb

20th-century American dramatists and playwrights
Film producers from New York (state)
1967 births
Living people
People from Amityville, New York
21st-century American dramatists and playwrights
Television producers from New York (state)